José Junior Dávila Gonzales (born 1 July 1998) is a Peruvian footballer who plays as a goalkeeper for Peruvian Primera División side Academia Cantolao.

Career

Club career
A product of Academia Cantolao, Dávila had his first experience on Cantolao's Peruvian Primera División team in the 2016 season, when he was on the bench for two league games. In 2018 and 2019, he was on the bench for 10 games in total, however, without making any official appearance for the team. 22-year old Dávila's official debut came on 9 February 2020 against Deportivo Llacuabamba in the Peruvian Segunda División, which Cantolao lost 3-1. He played two further games in that season.

References

External links
 

Living people
1998 births
Association football goalkeepers
Peruvian footballers
Peruvian Primera División players
Academia Deportiva Cantolao players